{{Infobox Boxingmatch
| Fight Name    = Unfinished Business
| fight date    = March 15, 2008
| image         = 
| location      = Mandalay Bay Events Center, Paradise, Nevada, U.S.
| titles        = WBC and vacant The Ring super featherweight titles
| fighter1      = Juan Manuel Márquez 
| nickname1     = Dinamita("Dynamite")
| record1       = 48–3–1 (35 KO)
| hometown1     = Mexico City, Mexico
| height1       = 5 ft 7 in
|weight1 = 130 lbs
| recognition1  =  WBC super featherweight champion [[The Ring (magazine)|The Ring]] No. 3 ranked pound-for-pound fighter2-division world champion
|style1 = Orthodox
| fighter2      =Manny Pacquiao
| nickname2     = Pac-Man
| record2       = 45–3–2 (35 KO)
| hometown2     = General Santos, Philippines
| height2       = 5 ft 6+1/2 in
|weight2 = 129 lbs
| recognition2  = WBC International super featherweight champion The Ring No. 2 ranked pound-for-pound fighter3-division world champion
|style2 = Southpaw
| result        =  Pacquiao wins via 12-round split decision (112-115, 115-112, 114-113)}}Juan Manuel Márquez vs. Manny Pacquiao II, billed as Unfinished Business''''', was a junior-lightweight title boxing match. The bout took place on March 15, 2008 at the Mandalay Bay, Las Vegas, Nevada, United States and was distributed by HBO PPV. The fight is second of the Pacquiao-Márquez tetralogy.

Pacquiao defeated Márquez via split decision, knocking down Márquez once in the third round. Two of the judges scored 115-112 and 114-113 for Pacquiao, while the third judge scored 115-112 in favor of Márquez. After the fight, Pacquiao admittedly considered this fight as his most difficult fight since their first match in 2004.

With the victory, Pacquiao became the first Asian boxer to win world titles in four different weight classes.

References

Marquez
2008 in boxing
Boxing in Las Vegas
2008 in sports in Nevada
Boxing on HBO
March 2008 sports events in the United States